is a Japanese football player for YSCC Yokohama.

Career
Ashino debuted with Tonan Maebashi and then signed for YSCC Yokohama's reserve team, before signing for the top team in December 2017. He debuted in J3 League in June 2018, coming in at the 83rd minute in an away game against Giravanz Kitakyushu.

Club statistics
Updated to 23 August 2018.

References

External links

Profile at J. League
Profile at YSCC Yokohama

1992 births
Living people
Association football people from Kanagawa Prefecture
Japanese footballers
J3 League players
YSCC Yokohama players
Association football defenders